Tinissa cultellata is a moth of the family Tineidae. It was described by László Anthony Gozmány and Lajos Vári in 1973. It is found in Uganda.

References

Moths described in 1973
Scardiinae